L.E. Cleveland House is a historic home located at Durham in Greene County, New York.  The original section was built in 1790 and is a two-story, five by two bay, central hall, single pile plan frame dwelling.

It was listed on the National Register of Historic Places in 2001.

References

Houses on the National Register of Historic Places in New York (state)
Houses completed in 1790
Houses in Greene County, New York
National Register of Historic Places in Greene County, New York